Luteophanol is a type of organic compound.  There are variants labeled luteophanol A through luteophanol D.  They contain the following common fragments with amphidinols:

 Polyhydroxyl groups.
 Two tetrahydropyran rings.

Luteophanols have demonstrated antibacterial properties, but unlike amphidinols, they do not show antifungal activity.

External links
 Y. Doi et al., "Luteophanol A, a New Polyhydroxyl Compound from Symbiotic Marine Dinoflagellate Amphidinium sp.", Journal of Organic Chemistry (1997) (abstract)
Abstract of article on Luteophanol D

Ethers
Alkene derivatives
Tetrahydropyrans
Polyols